Bierens de Haan is a surname of Dutch origin. People with that name include:

David Bierens de Haan, a Dutch mathematician and historian (1822–1895)
Johannes Abraham Bierens de Haan, a Dutch biologist and ethologist (1883–1958)

See also

de Haan (disambiguation)